Centretown West is a neighbourhood in Ottawa, Ontario, Canada. It lies to the west of Bronson Avenue, east of the O-Train Trillium Line, north of Carling Avenue, and south of  Nanny Goat Hill , which is an escarpment to the north of Somerset Street West. To the east lies Centretown, to the north lies Lebreton Flats, to the west lies Hintonburg, and to the south lies Dow's Lake. Much of the neighbourhood makes up what is also called Dalhousie.

Centretown West is composed largely of low-density residential commercial properties, and some light industrial uses. Somerset Street West is dominated by Chinese and Vietnamese businesses, and it is considered to be Ottawa's Chinatown. It also retains a large Italian-Canadian population in Little Italy centred on Preston Street, which is also called "Corso Italia". A portion of Gladstone Avenue is also called "Via Marconi", after the Italian inventor who completed some of his work in Canada.

Its population in 2011 was 10,693.

History
The area was annexed by the city of Ottawa in 1888. Prior to that it was part of Nepean Township, and the community was known as Rochesterville.

See also
List of Ottawa neighbourhoods

References

External links

Neighbourhoods in Ottawa